The Taça da Prefeitura do Distrito Federal (Cup of the Prefecture of the Federal District), commonly also  Torneio Municipal do Rio de Janeiro  (Municipal Tournament of Rio de Janeiro), was a tournament for clubs of the then capital of Brazil Rio de Janeiro which was held for the first time  in 1938  and which took place annually from 1943 to 1948. The last edition was in 1951. In 1996 the competition was revived for one more time as Taça Cidade Maravilhosa, the "Cup of the Marvellous City", after the byname of Rio de Janeiro. The importance of the tournament is subordinate and it always remained in the shadow of the state championship known as Campeonato Carioca.

The competition, which always took place before the start of the Campeonato Carioca, was usually held in a single round-robin league format, meaning without a return series. When teams finished even on points a deciding match was held. All of the teams that participated in the Campeonato Carioca took part in that competition, with the sole exception to the 1996 edition, when only the teams from Rio de Janeiro City that disputed the first level participated. As a consequence, the number of participants grew along with the championship's, going from nine in 1938 to eleven in 1951.

Fluminense, Flamengo, Botafogo, Vasco da Gama, America, and Bangu took part in all editions. Further participants were Bonsucesso, São Cristóvão, Madureira, Olaria and Canto do Rio from Niterói.

Winners 
 1938: Fluminense
 1943: São Cristóvão
 1944: Vasco da Gama 
 1945: Vasco da Gama 
 1946: Vasco da Gama 
 1947: Vasco da Gama 
 1948: Fluminense
 1951: Botafogo
 1996: Botafogo

References

External links
 Pedro Varanda: Rio de Janeiro - Torneio Municipal - List of Champions, Rec.Sport.Soccer Statistics Foundation and RSSSF Brasil, 1 October 2004.

Defunct football cup competitions in Brazil
Football cup competitions in Rio de Janeiro (state)